The 2018 season was the 111th season in which the Richmond Football Club participated in the VFL/AFL.

2017 off-season list changes

Retirements and delistings

Trades

National draft

Rookie draft

2018 squad

2018 season

Pre-season

AFLX

JLT Community Series

Home and away season

Finals

Ladder

Awards

League awards

All-Australian team

Brownlow Medal tally

Rising Star
Nominations:

22 Under 22 team

Club awards

Jack Dyer Medal

Michael Roach Medal

Reserves

The 2018 season marked the fifth consecutive year the Richmond Football club ran a stand-alone reserves team in the Victorian Football League (VFL). Richmond senior and rookie-listed players who were not selected to play in the AFL side were eligible to play for the team alongside a small squad of VFL-only listed players. The team was captained by former AFL listed defender Steve Morris. Hugh Beasley, Jake Aarts, Jacob Ballard and Tom Silvestro are also in the team's 2018 leadership group.

The team finished the home and away season with 14 wins and four losses, earning the minor premiership as a result. They were eliminated from the finals series after successive qualifying and semi finals matches against  and  respectively.

AFL-listed midfielder Anthony Miles won the club's best and fairest award for the second year running, along with the league's best and fairest award, the J. J. Liston Trophy. AFL-listed small forward Tyson Stengle led the team's goal-kicking with 33 across his 19 matches. Another AFL-listed small forward, Shai Bolton, received both the league's Mark and Goal of the Year awards.

Playing squad

Women's team
The 2018 season marked the first year the Richmond Football club ran a women's team and the first year in the VFL Women's competition (VFLW). Former men's VFL assistant coach Tom Hunter was named the team's head coach in November 2017. Jess Kennedy was named the team's inaugural captain in May 2018. The team finished the season with four wins and 10 losses, placing 11th on the ladder of 13 teams and failing to qualify for the finals competition.

Playing squad

VFLW Best and Fairest

References

External links 
 Richmond Tigers Official AFL Site
 Official Site of the Australian Football League

Richmond Football Club seasons
Richmond